Gyr or gyr can mean:
 Gyr (cattle), a Zebu breed of  cattle
 Billion years (Gyr)
 Guarayu language
 Gyrfalcon
 Phoenix Goodyear Airport, in Arizona, United States
 Radu Gyr (1905–1975), Romanian writer
 Get Your Rate, used at best boosting website EB24

See also 

 GIR (disambiguation)